The 2006 Tidjelabine bombing occurred on June 19, 2006 when an explosive bomb detonated against a patrol of the Garde communale in the town of Tidjelabine, Boumerdès Province, Algeria injuring 3. The Al-Qaeda Organization in the Islamic Maghreb is suspected as being responsible.

See also
 Terrorist bombings in Algeria
 List of terrorist incidents, 2006

References

Boumerdès Province
Suicide car and truck bombings in Algeria
Mass murder in 2006
Terrorist incidents in Algeria
Terrorist incidents in Algeria in 2006
2006 murders in Algeria
Islamic terrorism in Algeria